The Siemens-FlyEco Magnus eFusion is a German hybrid diesel-electric aircraft that was designed by Siemens and FlyEco, introduced at the AERO Friedrichshafen show in 2018. The aircraft is intended for series production as a ready-to-fly design.

The design was first flown on 11 April 2018 in Hungary. On 31 May 2018, the prototype crashed in Hungary, while on a training flight, killing its two occupants.

Design and development
The aircraft featured a cantilever low-wing, a two-seat side-by-side configuration enclosed cockpit under a bubble canopy, fixed tricycle landing gear, and a single engine in tractor configuration.

The aircraft was made from composites. The power train consisted of a Siemens SP55D electric motor which was intended to be powered by batteries for take-off and landing. A FlyEco three-cylinder diesel engine, derived from a Smart Car engine, with common rail injection and electronic controls, was intended to recharge the batteries in flight for extended range.

Accidents and incidents
The prototype crashed in Hungary on 31 May 2018 killing both occupants. The aircraft was on a training flight at the time. The accident investigation concluded that the crash was most likely due to pilot error in causing a high bank-angle stall close to the ground.

Specifications (Magnus eFusion)

See also
List of electric aircraft

References

Siemens aircraft
FlyEco aircraft
2010s German sport aircraft
2010s German ultralight aircraft
Single-engined tractor aircraft
Low-wing aircraft
Electric aircraft
Aircraft first flown in 2018